The 2009–10 Basketball League Belgium Division I, for sponsorship reasons named 2009–10 Ethias League, was the 82nd season of the Basketball League Belgium, the highest professional basketball league in Belgium. Spirou Charleroi won the national title, their third straight and ninth total title.

Regular season

|}

Playoffs

References

Basketball League Belgium Division I seasons
Belgian
Lea